The Finance Centre is a premium grade building in Bonifacio Global City, Metro Manila, Philippines. The building's architectural and interior design is a collaboration of GENSLER and AIDEA and was developed by Daiichi Properties & Development, Inc. The office building broke ground on June 5, 2014 and is the landmark building for Daiichi Properties. It is one of few buildings in the Philippines with LEED Gold rating. As of June 2012, the Philippines only has 38 buildings registered for LEED certification.

The topping-off ceremonies were held in May 2017 and was completed in 2018.

Design
The Finance Centre has a fully unitized curtain wall made of combined insulated high performance glass and aluminum composite panels. It has an enhanced structural design to resist earthquakes. The tower has 42 floors where 31 floors are dedicated for office spaces. Its form and layout is designed to provide flexibility for various planning needs of future tenants.
The Finance Centre was designed by Gensler.

The building contains a  plaza with water features and a sky garden above its retail podium.

Location
The Finance Centre is located at 26th Street corner 9th Ave. Bonifacio Global City Taguig and is near the establishments of Serendra, Bonifacio High Street, and Market! Market!.

References

Skyscraper office buildings in Metro Manila
Skyscrapers in Bonifacio Global City